Sikkim Krantikari Morcha (translation: Sikkim Revolutionary Front) is a political party in the Indian state of Sikkim which is the ruling party of Sikkim since 2019.

P.S. Golay, a former member of the Sikkim Legislative Assembly, was one of the prominent figures of the Sikkim Democratic Front (SDF) and was a minister in the government of Sikkim. Since December 2009 he has been a vocal critic of Pawan Kumar Chamling, the President of the SDF and the former chief minister of Sikkim. He started the party Sikkim Krantikari Morcha on 4 February 2013. Golay became the Chief Minister of Sikkim on 28 May 2019, thus ending the 25-year-rule of Chamling.

History

2014 election 
On 4 February 2013, SKM was established at Soreng, a western city of Sikkim. Bharati Sharma was elected the Working President of SKM who is the first female leader of the political party in Sikkim.

In September 2013 P.S. Golay formally seceded from SDF and became the Party President of SKM.

SKM contested assembly election from all 32 constituencies which were held on 12 April 2014. SKM won 10 seats and became the second largest party and opposition in the Sikkim Legislative Assembly. They secured 40.8% votes in the election. The former Chief Minister of Sikkim Nar Bahadur Bhandari gave his unconditional support to SKM party withdrawing his party Sikkim Sangram Parishad from participation in elections, 2014 and played an active role during campaigning phase of SKM party. Likely Former Chief Minister of Sikkim B. B. Gurung shown his support to SKM party, resigning from ruling SDF party.

For the by-poll of Sikkim Legislative Assembly which were held 13 September 2014, SKM established the alliance with Bharatiya Janata Party (BJP), and supported Bikash Basnet who was a candidate of BJP.

In 2017, SKM elected MLA Kunga Nima Lepcha as Acting President of the party and Similarly M.P. Subba and Navin Karki as Working President. Party also appointed Arun Upreti as Secretary General of the party.

2019 election 
The party came close to allying with Bhartiya Janata Party before the 2019 Indian Election but decided to fight alone. After the 2019 Sikkim Legislative Assembly election it decided to join the National Democratic Alliance on May 26, 2019 led by the Bharatiya Janata Party.

They contested on all 32 constituencies of the Sikkim Legislative Assembly and won 17 constituencies, thus ending Pawan Kumar Chamling's 25-year rule in Sikkim.

Indra Hang Subba won the Sikkim Lok Sabha constituency by defeating his nearest rival of Sikkim Democratic Front Dek Bahadur Katwal 12,443 margin.

Electoral results 
 Sikkim Legislative Assembly election

 Lok Sabha election, Sikkim

Frontal Organisation 
 Sikkim Krantikari Krishak Morcha
 Sikkim Krantikari Nari Morcha
 Sikkim Krantikari Yuva Morcha
 Sikkim Krantikari Shramik Morcha
 Sikkim Krantikari Vidyarthi Morcha
 Sikkim Krantikari Vyapari Morcha
 Sikkim Krantikari Chalak Morcha
 Sikkim Krantikari Avakashprapta Sainik Morcha
 Sikkim Krantikari Avakashprapta Karmachari Morcha

Chief Ministers

See also 
 Prem Singh Tamang ministry

Notes

References 

 
2013 establishments in Sikkim
Political parties in Sikkim
Political parties established in 2013